The Miracle Roses (Spanish: Las rosas del milagro) is a 1960 Mexican historical drama film directed by Julián Soler and starring Armando Silvestre, Crox Alvarado, and Jaime Fernández. It is set around the time of the Spanish conquest of the Aztec Empire.

Cast
 Armando Silvestre as Tlaltecalzin  
 Crox Alvarado as Emperador Moctezuma  
 Jaime Fernández as Nanoaltzin  
 Magda Urvizu as Citlali  
 Andrés Soler as Gran sacerdote  
 Francisco Jambrina as Obispo Fray Juan de Zumárraga  
 Miguel Manzano 
 Manuel Calvo as Hernán Cortés  
 Lilia del Carmen Camacho as La Virgen  
 Arturo Soto Rangel as Bernardino  
 Enrique García Álvarez  as Fray Pedro de Gante  
 José Chávez 
 León Barroso  as Fray Toribio de Benavente  
 Enedina Díaz de León as Vieja nana indígena  
 Antonio Bravo as Padre Francisco  
 Armando Gutiérrez as Padre José  
 Florencio Castelló as Fraile portero  
 Margarito Luna
 Rubén Márquez
 Anna María Gómez 
 Jorge Martínez de Hoyos as Juan Diego 
 Isabel Vázquez 'La Chichimeca' as Mujer indígena

References

Bibliography 
 Emilio García Riera. Historia documental del cine mexicano: 1959-1960. Universidad de Guadalajara, 1994.

External links 
 

1960 films
1960s historical drama films
Mexican historical drama films
1960s Spanish-language films
Films directed by Julián Soler
Films set in the 16th century
1960 drama films
1960s Mexican films